Elmir Lekaj (born 18 January 2000) is an Albanian footballer who plays as a defender for Rabat Ajax.

Career

Vllaznia
After spending several years in the club's youth system, Lekaj signed with the first team in April 2018. He made his debut in official competition for the club on 24 August 2019, coming on as a 77th-minute substitute for Arsid Kruja in a 1–0 home victory over Laçi.

Arbëria
In December 2020, Lekaj moved to Kosovan club KF Arbëria.

References

External links
Elmir Lekaj at SofaScore

2000 births
Living people
KF Vllaznia Shkodër players
Kategoria Superiore players
Albanian footballers
Albania youth international footballers
Association football defenders